The 2017–18 Under 20 Elite League was a football tournament for national under-20 football teams. It was the first edition of the Under 20 Elite League tournament.

The tournament was announced by the German Football Association (DFB) on 23 January 2017 as an expansion of the Under-20 Four Nations Tournament. DFB's Sporting Director Horst Hrubesch described the formation of the competition as an "important step" in player development and hoped to encourage the public to take an interest in U-20 games.  Each participating team played seven games on FIFA International Match Calendar.

The tournament was age restricted and only players born on or after 1 January 1997 were eligible.

Participating teams

League table

Matches

References 

Under 20 Elite League
2017–18 in European football